Benjamin Edwards (born 1970) is an American visual artist known for his work with satellite maps, architectural blueprints, and computer models as source material. He is the husband of political consultant and government official Neera Tanden.

Early life and education
Benjamin Edwards was born in Iowa City, Iowa. He earned a bachelor's degree from University of California, Los Angeles and studied toward a master's in painting at the San Francisco Art Institute before earning a Master of Fine Arts from the Rhode Island School of Design.

Career
Edwards is known for his paintings that employ appropriated imagery such as satellite maps, architectural blueprints or computer models as source material. His 2004 painting Immersion, for example, used cartography to explore the impact of the highway system on the development of the American suburbs. His 1998 work Starbucks: Seattle: Compression compressed all of the Starbucks stores in Seattle into one image. In other works, he has created landscapes from images of fast-food restaurants, commercial signs,  condominiums, shopping malls, convenience stores or corporate logos.

Collections
Carnegie Museum of Art
Museum of Modern Art, New York
Orlando Museum of Art

Personal life 
Edwards is married to Neera Tanden, a lawyer and Democratic political advisor. Tanden was the nominee-designee for Director of the Office of Management and Budget in the Joe Biden presidential administration briefly before her nomination was withdrawn after opposition.

References

External links
 

1970 births
Living people
American printmakers
Rhode Island School of Design alumni
University of California, Los Angeles alumni
Artists from Iowa
American male painters